Hero Gervacio Angeles (born December 8, 1984) is a Filipino actor. Hero Angeles bested four other contestants in the Grand Finals for the title "Grand Teen Questor" in the first season of ABS-CBN's popular reality star search in the Philippines, Star Circle Quest.

Career 
After winning the title of the first "Grand Teen Questor" of ABS-CBN's Star Circle Quest, Hero appeared in several TV shows on the network, like the youth oriented program SCQ Reload and the fantasy series Krystala, led by Judy Ann Santos. He was one of the hottest young stars in 2004, and his Love team with Sandara Park was popular, making box-office hits like Bcuz Of U and Can This Be Love.

In 2005, Hero ended his contract with ABS-CBN Star Magic, and later appeared in various TV shows on ABS-CBN's rival network, GMA-7. Until March 2008, Angeles is under the network contract of GMA Network with the management of German Moreno and brother Henry Angeles. His first break was playing the role of Mark in Dyesebel which stars Marian Rivera and Dingdong Dantes. After Dyesebel, he played one of the main villains in Luna Mystika, which starred his fellow former Kapamilya star Heart Evangelista and Mark Anthony Fernandez.

Angeles also made his directorial debut in 2007 entitled Stockroom, blending modern scares with social issues on employment of language teachers in the Philippines. It was sold-out at the Cinemalaya Philippine Independent Film Festival. The film also had its World Premiere at the prestigious St. James Cavalier Theatre in Valletta, Malta in Europe in November 2007. After joining Luna Mystika Angeles will join the first Sine Novela of Jennylyn Mercado and Mark Herras that entitled Sine Novela: Paano Ba Ang Mangarap?.

Since 2006, Angeles has been a regular co-host of German 'Kuya Germs' Moreno in the Saturday late night show Walang Tulugan with the Master Showman. shown through GMA and GMA Pinoy TV. Hero was also a student of University of the Philippines Diliman, College of Fine Arts. When Endless Love Philippine TV remake was in production, rumor had it that he was considered for the role of Andrew, which was eventually portrayed by Dennis Trillo in the series. It was also rumored in June 2011 that he would be part of Captain Barbell.

Hero is now endorsing the Philippine Tourism shirts, Favola Shirts - a project of the Pag-asa Social Center Foundation, Inc. located in Tagaytay City. The shirts are produced by the out-of-school youth of Tagaytay. Hero had donated some of his designs to this project.

On December 1, 2014, Hero launched his first Online Art Gallery called ARTCETERO. He creates artwork of different kinds. He aims to share his talent through the page in hopes of helping and inspiring others. 50% of the profit generated by his artwork is used to fund causes like iCancerVive and 'From the bottom of My heART'.

In 2018, Hero Angeles returns in the ABS-CBN drama series "Halik" as the gay Atty. Ken Velasco.

Visual arts

Solo exhibit

Filmography

Movies

Television

Awards

References

External links 
HEROANGELES.NET Hero's Official Website

1984 births
Living people
Filipino male television actors
Male actors from Metro Manila
People from Pasig
Participants in Philippine reality television series
Star Circle Quest participants
Star Circle Quest winners
Star Magic personalities
ABS-CBN personalities
GMA Network personalities
University of the Philippines Diliman alumni